Locust Corner may refer to:

 Locust Corners, Michigan, an unincorporated community
 Locust Corner, New Jersey, an unincorporated community
 Locust Corner, Ohio, an unincorporated community